Symantec may refer to:

An American consumer software company now known as Gen Digital Inc.
A brand of enterprise security software purchased by Broadcom Inc. in August 2019